Laurent is a French masculine given name of Latin origin. It is used in France, Canada, and other French-speaking countries. The name was derived from the Roman surname Laurentius, which meant "from Laurentum". It can also be derived from the Old Greek word Lavrenti, meaning "the bright one, shining one". Laurentum was an ancient Roman city of Latium situated between Ostia and Lavinium, on the west coast of the Italian peninsula southwest of Rome. The feminine form of Laurent is Laurence.

Politics
 Charles François Laurent (1856–1939), French senior public official and diplomat
 Claude de Roux de Saint-Laurent (died 1689), French soldier, governor of Saint Christophe
 Louis St. Laurent (1882–1973), twelfth Prime Minister of Canada
Jean-Luc Laurent (born 1957), French politician
 Jeanne St. Laurent (1886–1966), wife of Louis St. Laurent
 Laurent Alexandre (born 1972), French politician
 Laurent-Désiré Kabila (1939–2001), former president of the Democratic Republic of the Congo
 Laurent Gbagbo (born 1945), former president of Côte d'Ivoire
Laurent Grandguillaume (born 1978), former member of the French Parliament

Mathematics
 Laurent Schwartz, French mathematician
 Paul Matthieu Hermann Laurent, French mathematician
 Pierre Alphonse Laurent, French mathematician best known as the discoverer of the Laurent series

Royalty
 Laurent, Prince of Belgium, 12th in line to the Belgian throne

Science
 Auguste Laurent (1807-1853), French chemist
 Christian Laurent, French engineer
 Joseph Jean Pierre Laurent, a French astronomer
 Laurent Lantieri, French plastic surgeon who is a pioneer in the field of face transplantation
 Raymond Laurent, Belgian herpetologist

Sports
Emelyne Laurent (born 1998), French footballer
Laurent Blanc, French association football manager
Laurent Capet, French volleyball player
Laurent Chambertin, French volleyball player
Laurent Desbiens, French cyclist
Laurent Duvernay-Tardif (born 1991), Canadian player of American football with the Kansas City Chiefs
Laurent Fignon (1960–2010), French cyclist
Laurent Koscielny, French association football player
Laurent Manuel, American association football (soccer) player
Laurent Robinson, American football wide receiver for the Dallas Cowboys
Lucien Laurent, French association football player
Roger Laurent, Belgian racing driver
Laurent Pimond, French association football player

Other
 Joseph Laurent (1839–1917), Abenaki chief and linguist
 Laurent Bourgeois, choreographer and rapper from French dance duo Les Twins
 Laurent Brancowitz, guitarist for French band Phoenix
 Laurent Laplante (1934–2017), Canadian journalist, essayist and detective writer
 Laurent Nkunda, Congolese rebel general
 Harry Laurent (1895–1987), New Zealand recipient of the Victoria Cross
 Mathilde Laurent, French perfumer
 Mélanie Laurent, French actress
Yves Saint Laurent, French fashion designer
 Laurent Hébert, Québecois professional Magic: The Gathering player and mental health advocate

Fiction
 Dick Laurent, a fictional character in Lost Highway by David Lynch
 Laurent (Twilight), one of the nomadic vampires in Stephenie Meyer's Twilight series
Laurent of Vere, the love interest in the Captive Prince series by C. S. Pacat

See also
 Laurent (disambiguation)
 Laurence (name), feminine form of "Laurent"

French masculine given names
French-language surnames